Sidi Maârouf is a neighborhood of Casablanca, Morocco.

Since 1993,several multinationals have set up their headquarters in this area of casablanca.

Neighbourhoods of Casablanca
Morocco geography articles needing translation from French Wikipedia